Celta Vigo contested La Liga, Copa del Rey and the UEFA Cup in the 1998–99 season, which saw the club reach the quarter finals of the UEFA Cup and narrowly missing out on qualification for the Champions League.

Squad

Left club during season

La Liga

League table

Results by round

Matches

Top scorers
  Luboslav Penev 18
  Juan Sánchez 13
  Haim Revivo 9
  Valery Karpin 8
  Alexandr Mostovoi 6

Copa del Rey

Eightfinals

UEFA Cup

1st round

2nd round

Round of 16

Quarter-finals

Statistics

Players statistics

External links
   RSSSF - Spain 1998/99

RC Celta de Vigo seasons
Celta